Clairette may refer to:

People
Clairette Oddera or Clairette (1919–2008), French-Canadian actress and singer

Places
Clairette, Texas, an unincorporated community in Texas, United States

Wines and grapes
Clairette blanche, a white grape variety
Clairette de Die AOC, a French sparkling wine appellation
Clairette egreneuse, a synonym for the grape variety Graisse
Clairette precoce, a synonym for the grape variety Verdesse
Clairette Rose, a synonym  for the grape variety Trebbiano
Clairette rose,  the pink mutation of Clairette B
 Clairette rousse, Clairette Eorée, Grosse Clairette, Clairette à Grains Ronds, synonyms for the grape variety Bourboulenc

Other uses
 Ethinylestradiol/cyproterone acetate, a birth control pill

See also
Clairet, a rosé style of Bordeaux wine
Claret, a British term for Bordeaux red wine